William Garne (9 May 1861 – 24 May 1895) was an English cricketer. He was a right-handed batsman and right-arm medium-pace bowler who played for Gloucestershire. He was born in Middle Aston, Oxfordshire and died in Wellingborough, Northamptonshire.

Garne made a single first-class appearance for the team, during the 1884 season, against Sussex. From the lower-middle order, he scored a duck in the first innings in which he batted, and 2 runs in the second.

Garne died at the age of 34.

References

External links
William Garne at Cricket Archive

1861 births
1895 deaths
English cricketers
Gloucestershire cricketers
People from Oxfordshire
People from Wellingborough